Luis Bru Pérez (born 19 October 1907 in Barcelona, date of death unknown) was a Spanish boxer who competed in the 1924 Summer Olympics. In 1924 he was eliminated in the first round of the featherweight class after losing his fight to Livio Francecchini.

References

1907 births
Year of death missing
Boxers from Barcelona
Featherweight boxers
Olympic boxers of Spain
Boxers at the 1924 Summer Olympics
Spanish male boxers